Alypius may refer to:

 Alypius of Antioch, vicarius of Roman Britain, probably in the late 350s
 Alypius of Alexandria, music theorist, c. 360
 Alypius of Byzantium (died 169), bishop of Byzantium
 Alypius of Constantinople, Byzantine priest
 Alypius the Stylite (died 640), ascetic saint and monastic founder
 Alypius of Thagaste (died after 416), Catholic saint and bishop in 394

See also
 Alypus, ancient Greek sculptor

Masculine given names